Dömötör or Domotor may refer to
Dömötör Tower in Szeged, Hungary
Dömötör-Kolompár criminal organization in Canada
Dörmögő Dömötör, a fictional bear
Louis Domotor (born 1943), Canadian farmer and political figure
Mihály Dömötör (1875–1962), Hungarian politician
Zoltán Dömötör (1935–2019), Hungarian swimmer and water polo player
Ryan Domotor, Canadian politician

Hungarian-language surnames
Surnames of Hungarian origin